Peter Gaszynski (Polish: Piotr Gaszynski; 4 April 1963 – 9 August 2017) was a photographer, director, and producer based in Stockholm, Sweden.

History
Gaszynski started out as an assistant to one of Sweden's most known fashion photographer Stig "Stickan" Forsberg in 1982. He studied art history and several other courses at the University of Uppsala until 1986 and also has studied at the Stockholm Film School. Gaszynski has worked as a production designer in films, game shows, and television programs.

He has produced and directed several documentaries and worked on a large number of projects for television channels in Sweden.

The art photography of Peter Gaszynski combines digital technology with more traditional techniques. Gaszynski has had several exhibitions with his work including one 2007 exhibition in Singapore in which his photos of Swedish innovations were shown on bus shelters in the city. This was in collaboration with the Swedish embassy and the Singapore Ministry of Information, Communication and the Arts.

His company House Production produces commercials and documentaries for Swedish television "SVT".

Timeline
 From 1982 to 1986 University of Uppsala
 1985 Establishes House Worldwide interiors
 1986–1988 Studies at Stockholm Filmschool
 1988–2003 Working as a photographer, interior designer.
 Opens 3 showrooms in Sweden. Simultaneously working as production designer for film and TV. Also starts filming documentaries under own name.
 2003–2005 Freelance producer/segment producer for Swedish media companies "Strix" "Titan TV" "Baluba" "Eyeworks"
 2005 Establishes his own company "House Production"
 2006– exclusively working with photography and film projects under own name, mainly producing commercials and documentaries for Swedish National TV "SVT"

Associations
 The Swedish Association of Journalists
 Association of Sweden's Independent Filmmakers
 The Swedish Photographers Association

Filmography

References

External links
 Some of Gaszynski's films
 Swedish Film Institute Database
 

1963 births
2017 deaths
Swedish television producers
Swedish television directors
Swedish photographers